May Tieu is an American olympic fencer. She participated at the 2018 Summer Youth Olympics in the fencing competition, being awarded the bronze medal in the girls' foil event. At the 2021 World Cadets and Juniors Fencing Championships she won the gold medal in the individual foil, and bronze in the team foil. In 2019 she received the Jack Kelly Fair Play Award.

References

External links 

Living people
Place of birth missing (living people)
Year of birth missing (living people)
American female foil fencers
Fencers at the 2018 Summer Youth Olympics
Medalists at the 2018 Summer Youth Olympics
World Cadets and Juniors Fencing Championships medalists
21st-century American women